Piraeus Bank is a Greek multinational financial services company with its headquarters in Athens, Greece. Piraeus Bank's shares have been listed on the Athens Stock Exchange (ATHEX) since January 1918.

In Greece, with a 30% market share in loans (34.4 billion) and 29% in deposits (54.6 billion), is the country's largest bank.

Activities
Piraeus Bank is a universal bank providing various banking services.

Historically a bank supportive of SMEs it now also possesses particular know-how in the areas of agricultural banking, consumer and mortgage credit, green banking, capital markets, investment banking, leasing and electronic banking.

Piraeus Bank Group
Piraeus Bank and its subsidiaries form the Piraeus Bank Group.

History

Foundation
A group of shipowners in Piraeus founded Banque du Pirée (Piraeus Bank; BP) in 1916 to finance trade. The bank started trading on the Athens Exchange in 1918. The Greek government bought the bank in 1975 and transformed it into a universal bank. The new headquarters designed by Sir Basil Spence were built on Stadiou Street in the center of Athens. In December 1991 the government privatised the bank, which has grown in size and scope since then.

Expansion and consolidation
In 1962, PT joined the Emporiki Bank Group (or Andreadis Group). In On December 5, 1975, PT was nationalised and in 1991, the state privatized PT and the bank changed its name to Piraeus Bank (TP). Michalis Sallas takes over. In 1995 the Group established Piraeus Bank Romania with 160 branches and one year later Tirana Bank, the first privately owned banking institution in Albania with 56 branches. In 1999 with its acquisition of Xiosbank, PB took over Xios's branch in Sofia, Bulgaria; it has now some 83 branches in the country. PB also acquired the small New York-based Marathon National Bank and Interbank N.Y; it merged Interbank into Marathon Bank.

In 1998 the bank absorbed the Greek branch networks of Chase Manhattan Bank, Crédit Lyonnais, and acquired a controlling interest in Macedonia-Thrace Bank. A year later it added in the activities of National Westminster Bank and acquired Xiosbank (Bank of Chios) which it totally absorbed along with Macedonia-Thrace Bank. In 2002 Piraeus Bank signed a strategic alliance with ING Group (bancassurance). In 2005 it acquired the Bulgarian Eurobank, Atlas Bank in Serbia, Egyptian Commercial Bank in Egypt. In 2007 it expanded in Ukraine by acquiring the International Commerce Bank (renamed as Piraeus Bank ICB) and established Piraeus Bank Cyprus with the acquisition of Arab Bank Cyprus.

In 2002 the bank absorbed 58% of ETBA Bank (Hellenic Industrial Development Bank). PB also started a strategic alliance with ING Group, which took a 5% stake in the Piraeus Bank. In 2006 the PB sold back to ING its stake in a jointly owned mutual funds company. Cooperation continues via the bank-assurance company ING-PIRAEUS.

In 2005 Piraeus Bank acquired the Belgrade-based Atlas banka in Serbia (today Piraeus Bank Beograd with 42 branches), and the Egyptian Commercial Bank (today Piraeus Bank Egypt with 43).

In 2007 PB purchased the Cyprus arm of Arab Bank and renamed it Piraeus Bank (Cyprus).
On 13 September 2007 Piraeus Bank completed its acquisition of 99.6% of the share capital of International Commercial Bank in Ukraine, today named Piraeus ICB.

Financial crisis 

Within the European debt crisis, Piraeus Bank has been subject to the Greek austerity packages: the Hellenic Financial Stability Fund became its main stock holder since 2012 and remained such as of 2020.

In 2011, according to reports in July 2012, the bank obscured its real access to capital by providing circular loans to finance purchase of its own stock through undeclared offshore companies.

In 2012, Piraeus Bank took part in the restructuring of the Greek banks, gaining a leading position in the Greek banking sector.
In June 2012 Piraeus Bank sold its shares in Marathon Banking Corporation (New York City) to Investors Bancorp. The capital was used to finance the take over of the Greek banks Geniki Bank and healthy parts of ATEbank.
In 2012 it acquired the so-called 'good' part of Agricultural Bank.
In December 2012 it acquired Societe Generale's Geniki Bank.

In 2013, Piraeus Bank was considered as having sufficient capital and was included in the group of 4 systemic banks which would be coordinated by the Hellenic Financial Stability Fund to absorb undercapitalised banks. It would reach an international presence consisting of 370 branches focusing in Southeastern Europe and the Eastern Mediterranean as of 2014.
In March 2013 it took over the Greek branches of Bank of Cyprus, Hellenic Bank and CPB Bank.
In June 2013 it took over Millennium Bank (Greece).
In April 2015 it also absorbed the 'good' parts of small Greek Cooperative bank Panellinia.
In May 2015 it sold its subsidiary in Egypt to Al Ahli Bank of Kuwait.

After a probe by the European Commission over government bailouts following the Greek government-debt crisis, in July 2014 restructuring plans for the bank were approved.
In November 2015 the European Commission approved amended restructuring plans for Alpha Bank and Eurobank and then for Piraeus Bank on 29 November 2015, allowing a new injection of €2.72 billion of public funds via the Hellenic Financial Stability Fund.

In the following years, Piraeus Bank proceeded to divest abroad.
In March 2017, it sold Piraeus Bank Cyprus  to an investment group led by Lebanese businessman Maurice Sehnaoui, which renamed it AstroBank.
In September 2017, it sold its Serbian banking and leasing operations of Piraeus Bank Beograd, to Direktna Banka A.D.
In December 2017, it sold Piraeus Bank Romania to J.C. Flowers & Co.
In April 2018, it sold Piraeus Bank Beograd to Direktna Banka A.D.
In June 2019, it sold Piraeus Bank Bulgaria to Greek Eurobank and merged with its bank Postbank.

As of June 2019, the Hellenic Financial Stability Fund held 26% of outstanding common shares, while the remaining 74% was held by the private sector (legal entities and individuals).

HFSF had the option to €2 billion of perpetual bonds into Piraeus Bank shares in December 2022. As of November 2020, the total market capitalization of the bank was less than €500 million. The conversion was triggered in November 2020, giving HFSF a further 35% share of the bank, worth less than 200 million euro, a paper loss of over 1.5 billion euro.

In November 2020, the bank was nationalised.

See also

List of banks in Greece
List of companies of Greece
Banking in Greece

References

External links

 Piraeus Bank Athens Exchange quote on BloombergBusiness
 Piraeus Bank OTC quote (Grey Market) on BloombergBusiness

Banks of Greece
Companies listed on the Athens Exchange
Companies based in Athens
Banks under direct supervision of the European Central Bank
Greek brands
Banks established in 1916
Greek companies established in 1916